Glenn Previn Packiam (born February 27, 1978), is a Malaysian–American Christian musician, guitarist, pianist, worship leader and pastor, who serves as the lead pastor of Rockharbor Church in Costa Mesa, California. Prior to that, he was an associate senior pastor at New Life Church and the lead pastor of New Life Downtown in Colorado Springs, Colorado. Packiam's music is a pop rock style of contemporary worship music. He has released three musical projects, Rumors and Revelations (2009), The Kingdom Comes (2011) and The Mystery of Faith (2013). He has also published 5 books: Discover the Mystery of Faith, Lucky: How the Kingdom comes to Unlikely People, Secondhand Jesus: Trading Rumors of God for a Firsthand Faith, Butterfly in Brazil: How Your Life Can Make a World of Difference, and Blessed Broken Given: How Your Story Becomes Sacred in the Hands of Jesus.

Early and personal life
Packiam was born on February 27, 1978, in Petaling Jaya, Selangor, Malaysia, the son of a pastor, where he resided until his departure for Full Gospel Assembly as a member of their youth fellowship in Kuala Lumpur, Malaysia in 1993. He attended Oral Roberts University in Tulsa, Oklahoma, starting in 1996, where he graduated from in 1999, with his baccalaureate of arts in theological-historical studies, before leaving for Colorado Springs, Colorado in 2000. He took an associate pastor position in worship from the New Life Worship congregation, while he obtained his Master's degree in management from ORU. Packiam is the downtown lead pastor of their church. After studying at Fuller Theological Seminary for two years, he began earning his doctorate in theological at St John's College located at University of Durham which he completed in 2018. He is married to Holly, and together they have four children, residing in Colorado together.

Music history
His music recording career began in 2009, with the studio album, Rumors and Revelations, that was released on June 22, 2009, by Integrity Music. The subsequent release, an extended play, The Kingdom Comes, was released on May 28, 2011, from Integrity Music. He released, The Mystery of Faith, on March 5, 2013, with Integrity Music.

Discography
Studio albums
 Rumors and Revelations (June 22, 2009, Integrity)
EPs
 The Kingdom Comes (May 28, 2011, Integrity)
 The Mystery of Faith (March 5, 2013, Integrity)

References

External links
 

1978 births
American performers of Christian music
Living people
Singers from Colorado
People from Colorado
Songwriters from Colorado
21st-century American singers
21st-century American male singers
American male songwriters
Alumni of St John's College, Durham